Pasco County is located on the west central coast of the U.S. state of Florida. According to the 2020 census, the population was 561,691. Its county seat is Dade City, and its largest city is Zephyrhills. The county is named after Samuel Pasco.

Pasco County is included in the Tampa Bay Area and is primarily a bedroom community for Tampa and St. Petersburg.

It includes numerous parks and trails located along rivers, the Gulf of Mexico, lakes, and highway/railroad right-of-ways. Several nudist resorts are located in Pasco. It has become known as the "naturist capital of the United States," beginning with a development in 1941. West Pasco includes retirement areas, commercial fishing, and suburbs of Tampa. The Suncoast Parkway as well as U.S. 19, U.S. 41, U.S. 98, U.S. 301, and Interstate 75 all pass through Pasco. The county is directly west of Polk and Sumter counties, north of Hillsborough and Pinellas counties, and south of Hernando County.

History

Pasco County was created on June 2, 1887, from the southern third of Hernando County.  The same legislation also created Citrus County from the northern third of Hernando County.  The county was named after Samuel Pasco, who had just been elected to the United States Senate.

Dade City was named the temporary county seat until a popular vote was held in 1889, at which time voters made Dade City the permanent county seat. As early as 1917, residents of the western part of the county proposed forming a separate county or merging with Pinellas County, as Dade City was not centrally located in the county. The issue was finally resolved in the late 1970s with the construction of identical government centers in both Dade City and New Port Richey.

The earliest towns were Anclote, Blanton, Dade City, Earnestville, Fort Dade (not to be confused with Fort Dade on Egmont Key), Macon (Trilby), Lacoochee, St. Leo, and San Antonio. Citrus was an important industry when the county was formed, although a decline followed a freeze in 1895. Several large sawmills operated in the county in the early part of the 20th century. 

During the Florida land boom of the 1920s, New Port Richey became the winter home of silent screen star Thomas Meighan and golfer Gene Sarazen; Meighan attempted to bring other Hollywood figures to the city. The county has experienced significant population growth since the 1960s. The growth began along the Gulf coast but is now occurring most rapidly in areas north of Tampa.

Geography

Adjacent counties
 Hernando County—north
 Sumter County—northeast
 Polk County—southeast
 Hillsborough County—south
 Pinellas County—southwest

Climate
The county has a humid subtropical climate (Cwa) and average temperatures in Dade City range from 59.2 °F in January to 82.1 °F in July and August while in Port Richey they range from 59.0 °F in January to 82.2 °F in August. PRISM Climate Group at Oregon State University

Demographics

As of the 2020 United States census, there were 561,891 people, 209,483 households, and 139,278 families residing in the county.

As of the census of 2000, there were 344,765 people, 147,566 households, and 99,016 families residing in the county. There were 173,717 housing units at an average density of 233 per square mile (90/km2). The racial makeup of the county was 93.70% White, 2.07% Black or African American, 0.35% Native American, 0.94% Asian, 0.03% Pacific Islander, 1.52% from other races, and 1.38% from two or more races.  5.69% of the population were Hispanic or Latino of any race.

There were 147,566 households, out of which 23.50% had children under the age of 18 living with them, 54.60% were married couples living together, 8.90% had a female householder with no husband present, and 32.90% were non-families. 27.30% of all households were made up of individuals, and 15.90% had someone living alone who was 65 years of age or older.  The average household size was 2.30 and the average family size was 2.77.

In the county, the population was spread out, with 20.20% under the age of 18, 5.80% from 18 to 24, 24.10% from 25 to 44, 23.10% from 45 to 64, and 26.80% who were 65 years of age or older.  The median age was 45 years. For every 100 females there were 92.20 males.  For every 100 females age 18 and over, there were 89.10 males.

The median income for a household in the county was $32,969, and the median income for a family was $39,568. Males had a median income of $30,974 versus $23,802 for females. The per capita income for the county was $18,439.  About 7.60% of families and 10.70% of the population were below the poverty line, including 15.20% of those under age 18 and 7.70% of those age 65 or over.

Government and politics
Though the county seat is in Dade City, duplicate county government offices and court facilities are also located in the New Port Richey area on the west side of the county.

Politically, the county has been a swing area over the past quarter century. However, three of the last four elections have trended strongly Republican in Presidential elections, with 2008 being the exception. Although the GOP had the most votes in 2008, it was by a much smaller margin than the previous 2004 election or the subsequent 2012 and 2016 elections.

Transportation

Aviation
 Zephyrhills Municipal Airport (ZPH)
 Pilot Country Airport (X05)
 Tampa North Aero Park (X39)
 Hidden Lake Estates Airport (FA40, private airport near Moon Lake)

Bus service
Pasco County Public Transportation provides bus service throughout Pasco County.

Railroads
CSX operates three rail lines within the county. Dade City and Zephyrhills are served with a line from Plant City. Amtrak formerly provided passenger rail service to Dade City on that line, but the stop was terminated in late 2004. The other two lines include the Brooksville Subdivision which runs close to US 41 and the Vitis Subdivision, which runs southeast into Lakeland.

Notable abandoned railroad lines include a former branch of the Atlantic Coast Line Railroad northwest of Trilacoochee (formerly Owensboro Junction) that became part of the Withlacoochee State Trail, a segment of the Seaboard Air Line Railroad branch stretching from Zephyrhills to Trilacoochee, the former Tampa and Thonotosassa Railroad along the east side of US 301 that spanned from Sulphur Springs to Zephyrhills, part of the Orange Belt Railway which became the Atlantic Coast Line Railroad which ran from St. Petersburg and entered the county in what is today Trinity to Trilby (abandoned during the early to mid-1970s), and a branch of the Seaboard Air Line that ran through Holiday, Elfers and into New Port Richey.

The Atlantic Coast Line Railroad until 1957 ran the Southland through Trilby and Tarpon Springs, en route to St. Petersburg. The train was unusual for providing passenger service direct from Chicago (via the Pennsylvania), Cincinnati and Atlanta on a direct route through the western part of the Florida peninsula, bypassing Jacksonville. The Seaboard Coast Line (a merged line from the Atlantic Coast Line and the Seaboard Coast Line) until 1971 ran a local train (the last passenger train for the region north of St. Petersburg and west of Dade City) through those towns from Jacksonville and Gainesville, bound for St. Petersburg. Prior to the 1967 merger for the SCL that service had been the western branch of the ACL's Champion from New York City. Until 1968 the SCL ran its Sunland from Washington, DC and Portsmouth, VA to Tampa.

The SAL Tarpon Springs branch line from Tarpon Junction 14 miles west of Tampa to Elfers and thence to Newport Richey to New Port Richey was lost its passenger service and became listed as freight only between 1932 and 1938. The freight branch was truncated to Elfers in 1943. The tracks from Elfers and Chemical (an industrial area in the extreme southwest part of the county along the Anclote River west of Holiday) to Tarpon Springs were removed in the late 1980s, leaving the western half of the county without freight rail service.

Major roads

  Interstate 75  runs north and south across the eastern part of the county. Once a major connecting point with Tampa, I-75 has been made obsolete for western residents of the county by the Suncoast Parkway.
  Suncoast Parkway enters the county in the south halfway between Gunn Highway and US 41, and ends in the far northern part of the county at County Line Road (Exit 37), The Suncoast Parkway is a recently constructed toll road that connects Pasco County with Hillsborough County, where it becomes the Veterans Expressway and heads directly into Tampa International Airport before reaching Interstate 275. SR 589 has four Pasco County exits: SR 54 (Exit 19), Ridge Road (Exit 25), SR 52 (Exit 27), and County Line Road (Exit 37).
  U.S. Route 19 is a major commercial center running beside to the Gulf of Mexico on the western edge of the county, and used as a primary connecting route to cities down the west coast of Florida, including Tarpon Springs, Dunedin, Clearwater, and St. Petersburg to the south, as well as Spring Hill, Weeki Wachee, Homosassa and Crystal River to the north.
  Alternate 19 is a former section of US 19 that runs closer to the Gulf of Mexico in Pinellas and southern Pasco County than US 19.
  U.S. Route 41 (Land o' Lakes Boulevard) is the main south-to-north U.S. Highway through Central Pasco County. It enters the county from Lutz in Hillsborough County and serves as a commercial strip through most of Land o' Lakes. Further north the road becomes more rural, passing through Gowers Corner, and eventually enters Masaryktown at the Hernando County Line.
  U.S. Route 98 runs northwest and southeast from Hernando County to Polk County. Concurrent with US 301 between Trilacoochee and Clinton Heights.
  U.S. Route 301 (Fort King Highway/Gall Boulevard) is the main south-to-north U.S. highway in eastern Pasco County. It enters the county from Hillsborough River State Park in Hillsborough County and becomes the main road in Zephyrhills, Clinton Heights, and Dade City. North of Dade City, the road runs through Trilacoochee and Trilby before it enters Ridge Manor in Hernando County at a bridge over the Withlacoochee River.
  State Road 39 runs northwest and southeast from Plant City into US 301 in Zephyrhills
   County Road 41 (Fort King Highway/17th Street/21st Street/Blanton Road) begins as a hidden state road along US 301 until it branches off to the northwest as a county road in Zephyrhills and runs parallel to US 301 until it reaches Dade City. From here it moves further to the west through Blanton and Jessamine, and after crossing over I-75 curves back north into rural Hernando County where it becomes CR 541.
  County Line Road (CR 578) is a major county road running entirely along the border with Hernando County beginning at US 19, intersects the Suncoast Parkway, and ends at US 41. Due to increased congestion, it is planned to be upgraded from two to four lanes, and possibly upgraded from a county road to a state road.
  State Road 52 (Colonel Schrader Memorial Highway) an east–west route that runs primarily through the center of the county from US 19 in Bayonet Point to US 98–301 in Dade City.
  State Road 54 (Gunn Highway/Fifth Avenue) another east–west road that runs through southern Pasco County, from US 19 near Holiday to US 301 in Zephyrhills.
  State Road 56 is an east–west route that extends from SR 54 near Land o' Lakes, to just east of Bruce B. Downs Boulevard and the new campus of Pasco–Hernando State College in Wesley Chapel. The road was constructed in 2002, and is planned, to be extended to US 301 south of Zephyrhills.
  State Road 575 the northernmost state road in Pasco County.
  Bruce B. Downs Boulevard
  Rowan Road/East Lake Road (CR 77)
  Dale Mabry Highway
  Moon Lake Road/Decubellis Road/Massachusetts Avenue (CR 587) (N)
  Gunn Highway (CR 587) (S) is a short north and south extension of Gunn Highway(SR 54) that runs through Northern Hillsborough County towards Dale Mabry Highway and Busch Boulevard.
  Little Road (CR 1) is a major four to six lane county road in western Pasco County bypassing US 19 between southeast of Aripeka and Trinity.
  Trinity Boulevard (CR 996)

Education
Public schools in the county are operated by Pasco County Schools.

The county has seen explosive growth in student enrollment, increasing from 46,458 students in the 1999-2000 year to 65,126 in the 2007-2008 year, an increase of 18,668 or 40.2%. The projected enrollment for the 2007-2008 was 64,674, so the actual enrollment was 452 students over the projection. Yearly, the school district has grown 2,489 or 5.4%, which has led to the building of one new school a year. The enrollment in 2017 is up to 73,538.

High schools

 Anclote High School - Holiday
 Cypress Creek High School - Wesley Chapel
 Fivay High School - Hudson
 Gulf High School - New Port Richey
 Hudson High School - Hudson
 J. W. Mitchell High School - New Port Richey
 Land o' Lakes High School - Land o' Lakes
 Pasco eSchool
 Pasco High School - Dade City
 Ridgewood High School - New Port Richey
 River Ridge High School - New Port Richey
 Sunlake High School - Land o' Lakes
 Wesley Chapel High School - Wesley Chapel
 Wiregrass Ranch High School - Wesley Chapel
 Zephyrhills High School - Zephyrhills

Middle schools

 Bayonet Point Middle School - New Port Richey
 Centennial Middle School - Dade City
 Charles S. Rushe Middle School - Land o' Lakes
 Chasco Middle School - Port Richey
 Crews Lake Middle School - Spring Hill
 Cypress Creek Middle School - Wesley Chapel
 Dr. John Long Middle School - Wesley Chapel
 Gulf Middle School - New Port Richey
 Hudson Middle School - Hudson
 Pasco eSchool
 Pasco Middle School - Dade City
 Paul R. Smith Middle School - Holiday
 Pine View Middle School - Land o' Lakes
 River Ridge Middle School - New Port Richey
 Raymond B. Stewart Middle School - Zephyrhills
 Seven Springs Middle School - New Port Richey
 Thomas E. Weightman Middle School - Wesley Chapel

Elementary schools

 Anclote Elementary School - New Port Richey
 Bexley Elementary School - Land o' Lakes
 C. W. Taylor Elementary School - Zephyrhills
 Calusa Elementary School - New Port Richey
 Centennial Elementary School - Dade City
 Chasco Elementary School - Port Richey
 Connerton Elementary School - Land o' Lakes
 Cotee River Elementary School - New Port Richey
 Cypress Elementary School - New Port Richey
 Deer Park Elementary School - New Port Richey
 Denham Oaks Elementary School - Lutz
 Double Branch Elementary School - Wesley Chapel
 Fox Hollow Elementary School - Port Richey
 Gulf Highlands Elementary School - Port Richey
 Gulf Trace Elementary School - Holiday
 Gulfside Elementary School - Holiday
 Hudson Elementary School - Hudson
 J. M. Marlowe Elementary School - New Port Richey
 Lacoochee Elementary School - Dade City
 Lake Myrtle Elementary School - Land o' Lakes
 Longleaf Elementary School - New Port Richey
 M. P. Locke Elementary School - New Port Richey
 Mary Giella Elementary School - Shady Hills
 Moon Lake Elementary School - New Port Richey
 New River Elementary School - Wesley Chapel
 Northwest Elementary School - Hudson
 Oaksted Elementary School - Land o' Lakes
 Odessa Elementary School - New Port Richey
 Pasco Elementary School - Dade City
 Pine View Elementary School - Land o' Lakes
 Quail Hollow Elementary School - Wesley Chapel
 R. B. Cox Elementary School - Dade City
 Richey Elementary School - New Port Richey
 San Antonio Elementary School - Dade City
 Sand Pine Elementary School - Wesley Chapel
 Sanders Memorial Elementary School - Land o' Lakes
 Schrader Elementary School - New Port Richey
 Seven Oaks Elementary School - Wesley Chapel
 Seven Springs Elementary School - New Port Richey
 Shady Hills Elementary School - Spring Hill
 Sunray Elementary School - Holiday
 Trinity Elementary School - New Port Richey
 Trinity Oaks Elementary School - New Port Richey
 Veterans Elementary School - Wesley Chapel
 Watergrass Elementary School - Wesley Chapel
 Wesley Chapel Elementary School - Wesley Chapel
 West Zephyrhills Elementary School - Zephyrhills
 Wiregrass Elementary School - Wesley Chapel
 Woodland Elementary School - Zephyrhills

Special education centers
 F. K. Marchman Technical College - New Port Richey
 Harry Schwettman Education Center - New Port Richey
 James Irvin Education Center - Dade City

Private schools
 Academy at the Lakes (JK–12) - Land o' Lakes
 Bishop Larkin Catholic School (EC–8) - Port Richey
 Bishop McLaughlin Catholic High School (9–12) - Spring Hill
 Center Academy (4-12) - Lutz
 East Pasco Adventist Academy (K–10) - Dade City
 First Christian Academy (K-8) - New Port Richey
 Genesis Preparatory School (6–12) - New Port Richey
 Saint Anthony Catholic School (K–8) - San Antonio

Colleges and universities
 Pasco–Hernando State College
 Rasmussen College
 Saint Leo University
 Trinity College of Florida
 Webster College

Libraries

Pasco County Library Cooperative
The Pasco County Library Cooperative (PCLC) is the public library system that serves residents of Pasco County. It consists of seven branch libraries and one cooperative partner, the Zephyrhills Public Library. The Pasco County Libraries operated on a budget of $6,205,291 for fiscal year 2016–2017. Pasco Libraries circulated 2,623,024 items during that period. The head of library services reports to the Assistant County Administrator for Public Services.

Pasco County Library Cooperative Libraries
 Centennial Park Branch Library
 Hudson Library
 Hugh Embry Branch Library
 Land o' Lakes Branch Library
 New River Branch Library
 Regency Park Branch Library
 South Holiday Branch Library
 Zephyrhills Public Library

New Port Richey Public Library
The New Port Richey Public Library is located in the New Port Richey area of Pasco County. It is the only public library in Pasco County that is not a part of the Pasco County Library Cooperative. Since the library is independent, it issues its own library cards. Cards are free for all Pasco County residents and for those who pay property taxes to the city of New Port Richey. Members of libraries which have reciprocal borrowing agreements with the NPR library are also issued free cards.

Parks and recreation
Recreational areas include Hudson Beach, The New Port Richey Recreation & Aquatic Center, Odessa Community Park, Moon Lake Park, Land o' Lakes Heritage Park, Land o' Lakes Recreation Complex, Robert K Rees Memorial Park, Veterans Memorial Park, J. Ben Harrill Recreation Complex, the Jay Starkey Preserve, Werner-Boyce Salt Springs State Park, a section of the Suncoast Trail, a section of the Withlacoochee State Trail, Conner Preserve, Cypress Creek Preserve, Withlacoochee River Park, and Crews Lake Wilderness Park. Kayaking, canoeing, sailing, power boating, jet skiing, and fishing are popular along the coast, and large tracts are preserved from development.

Environmental lands acquired for preservation include Aripeka Sandhills Preserve, Boy Scout Preserve, Cypress Creek Preserve, Pasco County, Jumping Gully Preserve, Pasco Palms Preserve, Tierra Del Sol Preserve and Upper Pithlachascotee River Preserve.

Communities

Unincorporated communities
 Blanton
 Branchborough
 Darby
 Gulf Harbors
 Hudson Beach
 Jessamine
 Lumberton
 Richland
 Seven Springs
 St. Joseph
 Starkey Ranch
 Trilacoochee
 Vitis

Notable residents
 The Bellamy Brothers, country duo from Darby known for the hit "Let Your Love Flow" 
 John Cena, actor and professional wrestler; resides in Land o' Lakes.
 Debbie Deb, freestyle singer; resides in New Port Richey
 Mudcat Grant, professional baseball player
 Brooke Magnanti, scientist and author of Secret Diary of a Call Girl was born in New Port Richey.

See also

Notes

References

 History of Pasco County (1943) by Jefferson Alexis Hendley.
 Horgan, James J., Alice F. Hall, and Edward J. Herrmann, The Historic Places of Pasco County, Pasco County Historical Preservation Committee, Pasco County, Florida.

External links

 Official County Website
  Pasco Economic Development Council
  The Greater Pasco Chamber of Commerce
 History of Pasco County

 
Florida counties
1887 establishments in Florida
Counties in the Tampa Bay area
Populated places established in 1887